Charles Albert Wilson (3 September 1864 – 22 January 1950) was a British fencer. He competed in the individual and team sabre events at the 1908 Summer Olympics. He was a three times British fencing champion, winning the sabre title at the British Fencing Championships in 1904, 1905 and 1906.

References

1864 births
1950 deaths
British male fencers
Olympic fencers of Great Britain
Fencers at the 1908 Summer Olympics